The Borbera (Borbëa in Ligurian or Borbaja in Piedmontese) is a major torrente (a stream whose flow is marked by a high degree of seasonal variation) of the Province of Alessandria in the Italian region Piedmont.

Geography

The river passes through the territories of the following communes: Cabella Ligure, Albera Ligure, Rocchetta Ligure, Cantalupo Ligure, Borghetto di Borbera, Vignole Borbera, Stazzano, Arquata Scrivia, Serravalle Scrivia.

Rivers of the Province of Alessandria
Rivers of Italy